Juan de Villoldo (died 1551) was a Spanish painter from Toledo. He was apprenticed to his uncle, Alonzo Perez de Villoldo, a student of Juan de Borgoña. From 1547 to 1548, he painted a series of religious canvases for the Carbajal chapel in the Church of St. Andrew at Madrid.

References
 William Stirling Maxwell (1848). Annals of the Artists of Spain, Volume 1 ; pp. 148–149. John Ollivier Publisher, London.

Year of birth missing
16th-century Spanish painters
Spanish male painters
1551 deaths